Davide Zappella (born 29 April 1998,) is an Italian professional footballer who plays as a right back for  club Virtus Entella.

Club career
He started to play football in Pistoia for AC Capostrada and when he was 7 a talent scout recommended him to Empoli.
He made his Serie B debut for Empoli on 26 August 2017 in a game against Ternana.

On 10 July 2019, he joined Piacenza on a season-long loan. On 27 January 2021, he was loaned to Cesena.

On 16 July 2021, he moved to Pescara on loan, Pescara were obligated to purchase his rights in case of their promotion to Serie B.

On 8 July 2022, Zappella moved to Virtus Entella on a permanent basis.

References

External links
 

1998 births
Footballers from Bergamo
Living people
Italian footballers
Association football defenders
Empoli F.C. players
A.C. Cuneo 1905 players
S.S. Arezzo players
Piacenza Calcio 1919 players
Cesena F.C. players
Delfino Pescara 1936 players
Virtus Entella players
Serie B players
Serie C players